Rail Chase 2 is a rail shooter video game developed and published by Sega for the arcades in 1994, and the sequel to Rail Chase.

Gameplay
Rail Chase 2 is a game set in a coalmine cart racing along its set tracks through various environments as players shoot at everything they see.

Reception
In Japan, Game Machine listed Rail Chase 2 on their August 15, 1995 issue as being the fourteenth most-successful dedicated arcade game of the month.

Next Generation reviewed the arcade version of the game, rating it three stars out of five, and stated that "The levels vary greatly – the icelandic and jungle stages are especially imaginative and fun – various tracks can be chosen by shooting at the train stop sign, and the action never stops.  This game is simple fun, just like the arcades used to be."

Reviews
SuperGamePower (Feb, 1996)
Ultima Generacion 07
Ultima Generacion 08
Hobby Hitech Magazine
Game Players Issue 58 November 1995
GamePro Issue 078 January 1996

References

1994 video games
Arcade video games
Arcade-only video games
Rail shooters
Sega arcade games
Video games developed in Japan